Everything's Relative may refer to:

 Everything's Relative (1965 game show)
 Everything's Relative (1987 TV series)
 Everything's Relative (Yu-Gi-Oh!)
 Everything's Relative (1999 TV series)